Up and at 'Em  is a 1922 American comedy romance silent film directed by William A. Seiter, written by Eve Unsell with a story by Lewis Milestone and William A. Seiter, and starring Doris May, Hallam Cooley, and J. Herbert Frank.

The film had theatrical release August 16, 1922. It is unknown if any copies of this film survive.

Plot
Wishing to drive her father's car, Barbara Jackson (Doris May) dresses up in the chauffeur's uniform and sneaks out. For a lark, she picks up a passenger (John Gough), but it develops that passenger is part of a team of crooks who are planning to rob Bob Everett (Hallam Cooley), a rival of her father, of his precious artworks. Believing her to be an undercover detective, the bandit forces her to take part in the robbery and then abandons her to be caught by Everett.  After convincing Everett that she was a forced accomplice and not the real thief, the two hurry to meet up with Barbara's father, William Jackson (Otis Harlan).  He had just purchased one of the paintings from an art dealer (Harry Carter), and the dealer had left moments before Barbara and Everett arrive.  As the two explain the deception, William informs him that he became suspicious when recognizing the painting as one owned by Everett and that he had the dealer held at the front gate. The police arrive and round up the crooks.

Cast
 Doris May as Barbara Jackson
 Mrigaya Gandotra as Vivek Sandhu
 Hallam Cooley as Bob Everett
 J. Herbert Frank as Carlos Casinelli
 Otis Harlan as William Jackson
 Clarissa Selwynne as Jane Jackson
 John Gough as Crook
 Harry Carter as Crook
 Eddie Quillan

Production
After having directed films for the U.S. Signal Corps during World War I, Lewis Milestone traveled to California to work in the film industry.  Collaborating with director William A. Seiter on the script, Up and at 'Em marks his first Hollywood screenplay.

The film also marks the first screen role for actor Eddie Quillan.  When he and his four siblings were touring California as part of the Vaudeville Orpheum Circuit, his father had submitted the 5 children for auditions at Keystone Studios. After viewing the audition footage, Mack Sennett was so impressed with that of Eddie, that he hired detectives to track down the traveling family. Eddie Quillan was signed to contract in 1922, and Up and at 'Em was his very first film.

References

External links
 
 
 Up and at 'Em at SilentEra
 lantern slide coming attraction advert

1922 films
1922 comedy-drama films
American silent feature films
American comedy-drama films
American black-and-white films
1920s English-language films
Films directed by William A. Seiter
Film Booking Offices of America films
1922 directorial debut films
1920s American films
Silent comedy-drama films
Silent American drama films
Silent American comedy films